Denny Lambert (born January 7, 1970) is a former professional Canadian ice hockey player and member of the Batchewana First Nation. Lambert was drafted in the Ontario Hockey League where he played for the  Sault Ste. Marie Greyhounds for three years. He then played 2 seasons in the International Hockey League with the San Diego Gulls before signing as a free agent with the Mighty Ducks of Anaheim of the National hockey league. He was then signed as a free agent with the Ottawa Senators in July 1996 and went on to play for the Nashville Predators (1998-1999) and the Atlanta Thrashers. He rejoined the Mighty Ducks of Anaheim (2001-2002)  for his final NHL season before finishing off his career in the American Hockey League with the Milwaukee Admirals. He also coached the Sault Ste. Marie Greyhounds of the Ontario Hockey League from 2008–2011. He went on to be a First Nations Police Officer with the Anishinabek Police Service. Denny graduated from the Ontario Police College in November 2012. He was hired as an associate coach by the Gatineau Olympiques of the QMJHL in 2016.

Playing career
Throughout his NHL career, Lambert's primary role was that of an enforcer. The left winger played in 487 regular season NHL games, scoring 27 goals and 66 assists for 93 points, while racking up 1391 penalty minutes. After retiring, he accepted a position as assistant coach with the Sault Ste. Marie Greyhounds of the Ontario Hockey League, where he began his career as a junior player. On June 24, 2008, Lambert was named head coach of the Greyhounds, replacing Craig Hartsburg who signed to coach the NHL's Ottawa Senators.

Career statistics

Regular season and playoffs

Coaching career
Lambert became the assistant coach of the Sault Ste. Marie Greyhounds in the 2004–05 season, and remained in that position with the club until the summer of 2008, when Greyhounds head coach Craig Hartsburg left the team to become the head coach of the Ottawa Senators.  The Greyhounds promoted Lambert to the head coaching position.

In his first season as the head coach, Sault Ste. Marie failed to qualify for the post-season, as the young, rebuilding club finished with their fewest point total since the 1994–95 season, and finished in last place in the OHL.

The Greyhounds rebounded in Lambert's second season with the team, with the help of assistant coach Mike Stapleton, as the club with an impressive record of 36–27–1–4 to finish with 77 points, and fifth place in the Western Conference.  The Greyhounds faced the Plymouth Whalers in the conference quarter-finals, and lost the series in five games.

Lambert returned to Sault Ste. Marie for a third season in 2010–11, however, the team fell back into last place in the Western Conference, and on January 11, 2011, the Greyhounds relieved Lambert from his duties.  Sault Ste. Marie had a record of 14–21–5–0 at the time of his firing.

Coaching record

References

External links

Soo Greyhounds official web site retrieved 2007-10-28

1970 births
Living people
Atlanta Thrashers players
Baltimore Bandits players
Canadian ice hockey left wingers
First Nations sportspeople
Ice hockey people from Ontario
Mighty Ducks of Anaheim players
Milwaukee Admirals players
Nashville Predators players
Ottawa Senators players
People from Algoma District
San Diego Gulls (IHL) players
Sault Ste. Marie Greyhounds players
Sault Ste. Marie Greyhounds coaches
St. Thomas Wildcats players
Undrafted National Hockey League players
Canadian ice hockey coaches